Hymie may refer to:

Hymie Buller (1926–1968), Canadian-born US All-Star NHL hockey player
Hymie Gill (born 1973), New Zealand retired field hockey player
Hymie Kloner (born 1929), South African former footballer
Hymie Shertzer (1909–1977), American jazz saxophonist 
Hymie Weiss (1898–1926), Polish-American gangster rival of Al Capone
Hymie Simon (1913–2011), American comic book writer
Hymie, a recurring character on the television show Get Smart
A religious slur applied to Jews

See also
Hyman Martin (1903 –1987), also known as "Pittsburgh Hymie", a mobster
Hyman Holtz (c. 1896 – 1939?), "Little Hymie", New York racketeer
Jamie
Hyman